Feinmechanisches Museum Fellenbergmühle is a museum in Saarland, Germany.

External links
www.merzig.de

Museums in Saarland